Big Biz Tycoon allows the player to try their hand in the business world. Similar to other business simulation games, the intent is for the player to become a mogul of an industry. It was developed for Microsoft Windows by Animedia, and published by Activision Value.

Gameplay

Overview
The objective of the game is to create a successful business by developing products. As products are sold, the player earns money depending on the production rate and price of the product. This enables them to hire employees and decorate the office building. The products manufactured include game software, business software, military gear, medicine, clothing, toys, books, sports equipment, etc.

Hired workers are assigned to projects according to their abilities, and must develop and market a product. In addition, the owner of the business has the option to purchase a gift and offer it to one of the employees, which will improve one of their abilities.

Money can be saved in two methods: making deposits in the bank or purchasing stocks.

Missions 
Unlike some business simulation games, the assigned missions do not follow a sequence. Players who succeed in a mission may continue playing in it freely.

Reception
On Metacritic, the game scored a 50 based on 4 reviews.

See also
Big Biz Tycoon 2

References

External links

2002 video games
Activision games
Business simulation games
Video games developed in South Korea
Windows games
Windows-only games